Nádia Conceição Almada (born 28 January 1977) is a Portuguese-born British television personality. She is known for winning the fifth series of Big Brother.

Career

Big Brother
Almada competed in the fifth series of Big Brother in 2004; she kept her transgender identity secret from fellow contestants although viewers were informed. After 71 days in the Big Brother house, she emerged as the winner, securing 74% of the overall vote and winning £63,500.

Life after Big Brother
Almada went on to record a single entitled "A Little Bit of Action", which reached Number 27 in the UK Singles Chart in December 2004. She also made a guest appearance in the soap opera Hollyoaks turning on the Christmas Lights. She entered the Big Brother Australia house, visiting the three finalists during week 14 and has made various appearances on televised chat shows and game shows. In 2008, she co-presented The Big Brother Launch Night Project on the launch night of Big Brother 9. She also took part in Celebrity Fitness Videos Not Fit For TV, which was hosted by Lorraine Kelly and Eamonn Holmes. The show featured celebrities performing Almada's own Latino inspired dance/fitness video, Latino Dance Workout, which she released in 2004.

Almada was also a contestant on the Channel 5 reality series, Trust Me...I'm A Holiday Rep. Almada was a replacement for Make Me a Supermodel contestant Jasmine Lennard. The following year, she was a celebrity guest on a four-day stay on Channel 4 reality series Fool Around With...; her goal was to decipher who out of several male contestants was single, enabling them to win £10,000. In an interview with Heat magazine in June 2009, Almada revealed that she is writing her memoirs. In 2010, to mark the end of Big Brother in the UK, she appeared on a Big Brother winners special of Channel 4 show Come Dine with Me, with Big Brother winners Brian Dowling, Brian Belo and Sophie Reade. Almada finished in third place.

Ultimate Big Brother
On 24 August 2010, Almada entered the Big Brother house in Ultimate Big Brother. She was nominated for eviction on Day 8, and was evicted with 33.3% of the public vote in a double eviction after Makosi Musambasi on Day 11.

Personal life
Almada is a transgender woman from Ribeira Brava on the Portuguese island of Madeira.

References

External links
 
 "Nadia Almada - Biography" IMDb, Retrieved 31 March 2007

1977 births
Living people
People from Ribeira Brava, Madeira
Big Brother (British TV series) contestants
Big Brother (British TV series) winners
Portuguese emigrants to the United Kingdom
Portuguese LGBT entertainers
Madeiran musicians
Transgender women musicians
LGBT media personalities
Naturalised citizens of the United Kingdom
British television personalities

sv:Big Brother (Sverige)
Transgender musicians